Magnus Gottfrid Steendorff (25 November 1855 – 26 April 1945) was a Swedish architect.

Background
Magnus Steendorff was born in Copenhagen as the only son of  Danish painter Christian Wilhelm Steendorff (1817–1904) and his wife Swedish Anna Ulrica Öhrström (1816–1891). His sister Anna Marianne Steendorff  (1853-1941) was married to Swedish-American linguist, professor, and author  August Hjalmar Edgren (1840–1903).

He studied at the Royal Danish Academy of Art in Copenhagen, but settled in Sweden in 1887 becoming a Swedish citizen three years later. He was employed by the  Swedish government agency for the administration of state buildings  (Överintendentsämbetet).

Career
Notable buildings by Steendorff include two churches: the majestic neogothic  Undenäs Church (Undenäs kyrka), also known as the "Cathedral of Tiveden" (Tivedens katedral) from 1892–1894 and the new Stora Hammar Church (Stora Hammars kyrka ) in Höllviken from 1891–1895  designed in Danish Renaissance style.

Steendorff also designed the Institution of Johannesberg, an asylum located outside Mariestad from 1875. 
Other designed include a bank building in Skövde (1893–1894) and the new library of the University College of Jönköping (originally built as the foundry of a mechanical company in 1914).

Personal life
Steendorff was married to Sofie Brunskog (1855–1948).

References

Other Sources
 Svenskt porträttgalleri (Swedish portrait gallery), Vol. XX, Stockholm. 1901

External links
Jönköping University Library

1855 births
1945 deaths
Swedish architects
Architects from Copenhagen
Royal Danish Academy of Fine Arts alumni